is a Japanese football  who will play for Criacao Shinjuku from the 2023 season.

Career
In 2010, Nakayama begin first career with Ryutsu Keizai University.

In 2013, Nakayama joined to J2 club, Roasso Kumamoto from 2014 until he left from the club in 2019 after six seasons at Kumamoto.

In 2020, Nakayama joined to J2 club, Thespakusatsu Gunma until end of the 2022 season.

On 30 November 2022, Nakayama officially transfer to JFL club, Criacao Shinjuku for upcoming 2023 season.

Club statistics
.

References

External links

Profile at Roasso Kumamoto

1991 births
Living people
Ryutsu Keizai University alumni
Association football people from Hiroshima Prefecture
Japanese footballers
J2 League players
J3 League players
Japan Football League players
Roasso Kumamoto players
Thespakusatsu Gunma players
Criacao Shinjuku players
Association football midfielders